William J. Hartman is a United States Army major general who has served as the Commander of the Cyber National Mission Force since August 2019. He previously served as the Deputy Commanding General of Joint Force Headquarters–Cyber of the United States Army Cyber Command from August 1, 2017 to August 2019.

References

Living people
Place of birth missing (living people)
Recipients of the Legion of Merit
United States Army generals
United States Army personnel of the Gulf War
United States Army personnel of the Iraq War
United States Army personnel of the War in Afghanistan (2001–2021)
Year of birth missing (living people)